The 1969 Greenlandic Football Championship was the 7th edition of the Greenlandic Men's Football Championship. The final round was held in Nuuk. It was the third football championship won by Kissaviarsuk-33.

Qualifying stage

North Greenland
Nanok-50 qualified for the final Round.

Disko Bay
Tupilak-41 qualified for the final Round.

Central Greenland

B-67 Nuuk qualified for the final Round.

South Greenland
Kissaviarsuk-33 qualified for the final Round.

Final round

Semi-finals

Final

See also
Football in Greenland
Football Association of Greenland
Greenland national football team
Greenlandic Football Championship

References

Greenlandic Men's Football Championship seasons
Green
Green
Foot